Duarte's Tavern is a historic drinking establishment and restaurant, founded in 1894 and located at 202 Stage Road in Pescadero, California.

About
Duarte's Tavern was founded in 1894, by Frank Duarte, a Portuguese immigrant who bought the building for approximately $12 worth of gold. As of 2017, it was owned and operated by the fourth generation of the Duarte family. 

They are well known for their olallieberry pie, artichoke soup (which is also served as half artichoke and half green chile soup) and cioppino, a signature item that was described as "bone-warming" but "very messy". The cuisine includes seafood such as fried oysters with fries, snapper, and a crab sandwich which, according to the [[San Francisco Chronicle|San Francisco Chronicle'''s]] Michael Bauer, had "a lot of thought put into it" with the inside of the sourdough bread toasted enough to hold a "pile of crab" and a "leaf of lettuce". The menu also includes non-seafood items such as a hot beef sandwich with mashed potatoes and gravy.  

Reception
In 2017, Dana Joseph, writing for the Cowboys & Indians magazine, called the cioppino at Duarte's Tavern a "flavorful crab-crammed delight". 

On October 22, 2007, Duarte's Tavern was featured on the fourth episode of the second season of the television show, Diners, Drive-Ins and Dives'' entitled "Local Flavors". In 2003, Duarte's Tavern received the James Beard American Classic Award.

References

Buildings and structures in San Mateo County, California
History of San Mateo County, California
1894 establishments in California
Commercial buildings completed in 1894
Restaurants in California
James Beard Foundation Award winners
Portuguese-American culture in California